Sinotrechiama is a genus of beetles in the family Carabidae, containing the following species:

 Sinotrechiama duboisi Deuve, 2004
 Sinotrechiama imitator Belousov & Kabak, 2003
 Sinotrechiama parvus Ueno, 2006
 Sinotrechiama pilifer Belousov & Kabak, 2003
 Sinotrechiama tronqueti (Deuve, 1995)

References

Trechinae